is the ninth single by the Japanese entertainer Miho Nakayama. Written by Takashi Matsumoto and Kyōhei Tsutsumi, the single was released on March 18, 1987, by King Records.

Background and release
"Hade!!!" was used as the theme song of the TBS drama series , which starred Nakayama. The B-side, "Jealousy", was used as an image song in the drama. This single was the final collaboration between Nakayama and the songwriters Matsumoto and Tsutsumi, after four albums and five singles (with an additional two singles written by Matsumoto and other composers).

"Hade" peaked at No. 2 on Oricon's weekly singles chart and sold over 205,000 copies.

Track listing
All lyrics are written by Takashi Matsumoto; all music composed by Kyōhei Tsutsumi; all music arranged by Motoki Funayama.

Charts
Weekly charts

Year-end charts

References

External links

1987 singles
1987 songs
Japanese-language songs
Japanese television drama theme songs
Miho Nakayama songs
Songs with lyrics by Takashi Matsumoto (lyricist)
Songs with music by Kyōhei Tsutsumi
King Records (Japan) singles